El diablo no es tan diablo is a 1949 Mexican fantasy comedy film directed by Julián Soler and produced by Alfredo Ripstein. It starred Sara García, Julián Soler, Amparo Morillo, and Fernando Soto. It was the first Mexican featured film that combined live-action and animation sequences.

References

External links
 

1949 films
Mexican fantasy comedy films
Mexican black-and-white films
1940s Spanish-language films
Films directed by Julián Soler
1940s fantasy comedy films
1949 comedy films
1940s Mexican films